Tord Göran Andersson (born 11 March 1942) is a retired Swedish diver who won a silver medal in the 3 m springboard at the 1966 European Championships. Two years later he competed in the springboard and in the platform at the 1968 Olympics and finished seventh and eleventh, respectively.

References

1942 births
Living people
Swedish male divers
Olympic divers of Sweden
Divers at the 1968 Summer Olympics
Universiade medalists in diving
Universiade bronze medalists for Sweden
Medalists at the 1967 Summer Universiade
Sportspeople from Malmö
20th-century Swedish people
21st-century Swedish people